Harry Payne Whitney (April 29, 1872 – October 26, 1930) was an American businessman, thoroughbred horse breeder, and member of the prominent Whitney family.

Early years 
Whitney was born in New York City on April 29, 1872, as the eldest son of Flora Payne and William C. Whitney (1841–1904), a very wealthy businessman and United States Secretary of the Navy. Whitney was the elder brother of William Payne Whitney (1876–1927). His sister Pauline Payne Whitney (1874–1916) married Almeric Hugh Paget, 1st Baron Queenborough (1861–1949), and his youngest sister Dorothy Payne Whitney (1887–1968) was married to Willard Dickerman Straight (1880–1918), and later to Leonard Knight Elmhirst (1893–1974) after Straight's death.

Whitney studied at Groton School in Groton, Massachusetts, then attended Yale University, graduating in 1894. He was a member of the Skull and Bones. After Yale, he spent two years at Columbia Law School, but he never finished the course and decided to enter the world of sports and business. He was a member of the class of 1898. In 1904, after the death of his father, he inherited $24,000,000, and in 1917, he inherited approximately $12,000,000 along with the large steam yacht Aphrodite from his uncle, Oliver Hazard Payne.

Sporting career
An avid sportsman, Whitney was a ten-goal polo player.  His love of the sport was inherited from his father, who had been involved with polo when it was first organized in the United States in 1876 by James Gordon Bennett, Jr.  Whitney organized the U.S. polo team that beat England in 1909. "Whitney Field" polo field near Saratoga Springs, New York, is named for him.

He was a board member of the Montauk Yacht Club and competed with his yacht Vanitie in the America's Cup.  Whitney also served on the board of directors of the Long Island Motor Parkway, built by his wife's cousin, William Kissam Vanderbilt II.

Whitney enjoyed quail hunting and purchased the  Foshalee Plantation in northern Leon County, Florida, from Sydney E. Hutchinson of Philadelphia, Pennsylvania.

Thoroughbred horse racing 

Whitney was a major figure in Thoroughbred racing and in 2018 was voted one of the National Museum of Racing and Hall of Fame's most prestigious honors as one of the Pillars of the Turf.

Harry Whitney inherited a large stable from his father including the great filly Artful and her sire Hamburg, and in 1915 established a horse breeding farm in Lexington, Kentucky where he developed the American polo pony by breeding American Quarter Horse stallions with his thoroughbred mares. He was thoroughbred racing's leading owner of the year in the United States on eight occasions and the breeder of almost two hundred stakes race winners. His leading sire was first Hamburg and then the great sire Broomstick, by Ben Brush. His Kentucky-bred horse Whisk Broom II (sired by Broomstick) raced in England, then at age six came back to the U.S. where he won the New York Handicap Triple. He also owned Upset, who gave Man o' War the only loss of his career.

Whitney had nineteen horses who ran in the Kentucky Derby, winning it the first time in 1915 with another Broomstick foal, Regret, the first filly ever to capture the race. Regret went on to earn Horse of the Year honors and was named to the National Museum of Racing and Hall of Fame. Whitney won the Kentucky Derby for the second time in 1927 with the colt Whiskery. His record of six wins in the Preakness Stakes stood as the most by any breeder until 1968 when Calumet Farm broke the record. Whitney's colt Burgomaster won the 1906 Belmont Stakes and also received Horse of the Year honors. Among the many horses, Whitney's breeding operation produced Equipoise and Johren.

Whitney's stable won the following prestigious U.S. Triple Crown races:

 Kentucky Derby:
 1915 : Regret (filly; voted Horse of the Year)
 1927 : Whiskery
 Preakness Stakes:
 1908 : Royal Tourist
 1913 : Buskin
 1914 : Holiday
 1921 : Broomspun
 1927 : Bostonian
 1928 : Victorian
Belmont Stakes:
 1905 : Tanya (filly)
 1906 : Burgomaster (voted Horse of the Year)
 1913 : Prince Eugene
 1918 : Johren

His Lexington, Kentucky stud farm was passed on to his son, C.V. Whitney, who owned it until 1989 when it became part of Gainesway Farm.

Personal life

On August 25, 1896 he married Gertrude Vanderbilt (1875–1942), a member of the wealthy Vanderbilt family.  In New York, the couple lived in town houses originally belonging to William Whitney, first at 2 East 57th St., across the street from Gertrude's parents, and after William Whitney's death, at 871 Fifth Avenue. They also had a country estate in Westbury, Long Island. Together, they had three children:
Flora Payne Whitney (1897-1986)
Cornelius Vanderbilt Whitney (1899-1992)
Barbara Vanderbilt Whitney (1903-1982).

Harry Whitney died in 1930 at age fifty-eight. He and his wife are interred in the Woodlawn Cemetery, The Bronx. Time magazine reported that at the time of his death, Harry Payne Whitney's estate was appraised by New York State for tax collection purposes at $62,808,000 net.

Whitney owned numerous incarnations of his father's Pullman Wanderer rail car.

Philanthropy 
The benefactor to many organizations, in 1920 H.P. Whitney financed the Whitney South Seas Expedition of the American Museum of Natural History, Rollo Beck's major zoological expedition that sent teams of scientists and naturalists to undertake botanical research and to study the bird population of several thousand islands in the Pacific Ocean.

The Whitney Collection of Sporting Art was donated in his memory to the Yale University Art Gallery.

References

External links
 
 June 5, 1904 New York Times article on Harry Payne Whitney
 Harry Payne Whitney obituary

1872 births
1930 deaths
Philanthropists from New York (state)
American polo players
American racehorse owners and breeders
Owners of Kentucky Derby winners
United States Thoroughbred Racing Hall of Fame inductees
American people of English descent
Burials at Woodlawn Cemetery (Bronx, New York)
Groton School alumni
Businesspeople from New York City
Whitney family
Yale University alumni
International Polo Cup
New York (state) Democrats
People from Old Westbury, New York
Columbia Law School alumni